Toronto East (called East Toronto until 1903) was a federal electoral district represented in the House of Commons of Canada from 1867 to 1935. It was located in the city of Toronto in the province of Ontario. It was created by the British North America Act of 1867.

East Toronto initially consisted of St. Lawrence, St. Davids and St. James Wards of the city of Toronto. In 1872, St. James Ward was excluded from the riding. After 1903, the boundaries varied, but generally included the part of the city east of Sherbourne Street.

The electoral district was abolished in 1933 when it was redistributed between Broadview and Greenwood ridings.

Electoral history

East Toronto

|- 
  
|Conservative
|James Beaty
|align="right"| 1,113
 
|Reformer
|William Thomas Aikins
|align="right"| 980 
 
|Unknown
|  Mr. Allen
|align="right"| 1   
|}

|-
  
|Conservative
|James Beaty, Sr.
|align="right"| 872 
  
|Liberal
|John O'Donohoe
|align="right"| 775
|}

|-
  
|Liberal-Conservative
|John O'Donohoe
|align="right"|1,289
 
|Unknown
|E. Coatsworth
|align="right"|1,152
|}

|-
 
|Independent
|Samuel Platt
|align="right"| 1,396 
 
|Unknown
|John O'DONOHUE
|align="right"| 982    
|}

|-
 
|Independent
|Samuel Platt
|align="right"| 1,743   
 
|Unknown
|Ed  GALLEY
|align="right"|1,052
|}

|-
  
|Conservative
|John Small
|align="right"|1,922 
 
|Unknown
|Thomas  THOMPSON
|align="right"|1,496   
|}

|-
  
|Conservative
|John Small
|align="right"|2,858 
  
|Liberal
| Alfred  YOUNG
|align="right"|1,603    
 
|Independent
|Ernest A. Macdonald
|align="right"|164  
|}

|-
  
|Conservative
|Emerson Coatsworth
|align="right"| 3,520 
  
|Liberal
|Alex E. WHEELER
|align="right"| 2,056    
|}

|-
 
|Independent Conservative
|John Ross Robertson
|align="right"| 4,631
  
|Conservative
|Emerson Coatsworth
|align="right"| 3,012  
|}

|-
  
|Conservative
|Albert E. Kemp
|align="right"| 4,07
  
|Liberal
|George  ANDERSON
|align="right"| 2,830

|Labour
|Andrew  MCFARREN
|align="right"| 93    
|}

Toronto East

|-
  
|Conservative
|Albert Edward Kemp
|align="right"|4,125 
  
|Liberal
|John Knox  LESLIE
|align="right"|1,993  
|}

|-
 
|Independent
|Joseph Russell
|align="right"| 4,039    
  
|Conservative
|Albert Edward Kemp
|align="right"| 3,246 
|}

|-
  
|Conservative
|Albert Edward Kemp
|align="right"| 7,082 
 
|Independent
|Joseph Russell
|align="right"| 2,281 
  
|Liberal
|James  PEARSON
|align="right"| 1,878 

|Labour
|James Richards
|align="right"|463    
|}

|-
  
|Conservative
|Albert Edward Kemp
|align="right"| acclaimed   
|}

|-
  
|Government
|Albert Edward Kemp
|align="right"| 15,894
  
|Opposition
|John Tristam  VICK
|align="right"| 4,399    
|}

|-
  
|Conservative
|Edmond Baird Ryckman
|align="right"| 5,392 

 
|Independent
|Thomas  FOSTER
|align="right"| 3,680 
 
|Labour
| John William   BRUCE
|align="right"| 1,822   
  
|Liberal
|Elizabeth Bethune   KIELY
|align="right"| 52    
|}

|-
  
|Conservative
|Edmond Baird Ryckman
|align="right"| 17,663
  
|Liberal
|Gerald   FARRELL
|align="right"| 4,036   
|}

|-
  
|Conservative
|Edmond Baird Ryckman 
|align="right"|13,789 
  
|Liberal
|Kathleen   BENNETT
|align="right"| 3,299    
|}

|-
  
|Conservative
|Edmond Baird Ryckman 
|align="right"| 13,423 
  
|Liberal
|Robert A. ALLEN
|align="right"| 6,348  
|}

|-
  
|Conservative
|Edmond Baird Ryckman 
|align="right"| acclaimed   
|}

|-
  
|Conservative
|Thomas Langton CHURCH
|align="right"|13,227 
  
|Liberal
|Harold Proctor  SNELGROVE
|align="right"| 10,721
 
|Co-operative Commonwealth
|Graham SPRY  
|align="right"|4,649    
|}

See also 

 List of Canadian federal electoral districts
 Past Canadian electoral districts

References

External links 
 Parliament of Canada: History of Federal Ridings since 1867: Toronto East

Former federal electoral districts of Ontario
Federal electoral districts of Toronto